The List of Old Rossallians lists persons who attended or are associated with the Rossall School in Lancashire.

Academic
 Peter Barton – First World War historian and author
 William Chawner – Vice Chancellor of the University of Cambridge 1899–1901
 John Standish Fforde – economist, historian and Chief Cashier at the Bank of England
 David Fowler – mathematician
 Robert James – High Master of St Paul's School and Headmaster of Harrow School
 Sir Henry Stuart Jones – classical scholar and lexicographer
 Charles Lethbridge Kingsford – historian and fellow of the British Academy
 Geoffrey Kirk – Regius Professor of Greek at Cambridge 
 Hugh Trevor Lambrick - archaeologist, historian and administrator
 Dr John Morris – historian and founder of the historical journal Past & Present
 Charles Kay Ogden – linguist, psychologist and philosopher and inventor of Basic English
 Sir Isambard Owen – first Vice Chancellor of Bristol University and founder of The University of Wales
 Niall Shanks – philosopher

There have been many Old Rossallians who have become headmasters at public schools since its foundation in 1844, including Winchester College, Charterhouse School, Rugby School, Merchant Taylor's, Marlborough College, Cheltenham College, Dragon School, Wellington College, Harrow School, Malvern College, Dulwich College, Sevenoaks School and Christ's Hospital. The current crop includes the Headmasters at Bedales School and Shrewsbury School.

Literary
 J. R. Ackerley – author, editor, and memoirist
 Leslie Charteris – creator of The Saint
 J.G. Farrell – novelist and winner of the Booker Prize
 R. Welldon Finn – historical writer
 F. W. Harvey, DCM – poet
 Raymond M. Patterson – explorer and travel writer
 Clive Phillipps-Wolley – author and big game hunter

Media and television
 Michael Barratt – BBC TV Nationwide anchorman
 Patrick Campbell – team captain on Call My Bluff
 Sonny Flood – actor in Hollyoaks
 Davinia Taylor – actress and It Girl

Military
 George Clarke, 1st Baron Sydenham of Combe – Governor of Bombay and Victoria
Major General Ralph Arthur Penrhyn Clements – British Army general during the Second Boer War
 Field Marshal Sir Charles Comyn Egerton – First World War Field Marshal, member of the Council of the India, Commander of the Somaliland Field Force
 Edward Fitzherbert (CBE, DSO, MC) – British Army general
 Colonel Sir George Malcolm Fox, Inspector of Gymnasia and sword designer
 Air Commodore Robert Groves – Deputy Chief of the Air Staff
 Captain George S. Henderson (VC)
 General Sir Thomas Hutton (MC, KCB, KCIE)
 Wing Commander Ronald Gustave Kellet – Second World War flying ace
 Frederick Lugard (GCMG, CB, DSO, PC) – governor of Hong Kong and Nigeria and founder of the University of Hong Kong
 Air Chief Marshal Sir Charles Edward Hasting Medhurst (KCB OBE MC) – Director of Allied Air Co-Operation (1940) and key figure in the RAF throughout the Second World War
 General John Nixon – First World War General
 Sir Charles Noble Arden-Clarke – Colonial Governor, last Governor of the Gold Coast
 Brigadier George Rowland Patrick Roupell (VC)
 Erroll Chunder Sen – First World War Indian aviator
 Vice Admiral Sir David Steel – Second Sea Lord

Misc
 Sir Alexander Carmichael Bruce – Assistant Commissioner of Police of the Metropolis
 Sir Norman Kendal – Assistant Commissioner of Police of the Metropolis and Barrister
 Rachel Lomax – Deputy Governor of the Bank of England (Rossall Junior School)
 Loris Couyoumdjian - Businessman & Philippine Consul in Chile

Music and the arts

 Bill Ashton – founder of the National Youth Jazz Orchestra
 Sir Thomas Beecham – conductor and founder of numerous orchestras including the London Philharmonic and Royal Philharmonic
 Anthony Besch – opera director
 Little Boots (Victoria Hesketh) – singer/songwriter
 James Donald – actor (The Great Escape, The Bridge on the River Kwai)
 Robert Hamer - film director (Kind Hearts and Coronets)
 Bill Hopkins – composer, pianist and music critic
 Christopher Whall – founder of the New England School of Stained Glass craftsmanship. Helped William Morris establish the William Morris Arts and Crafts Society.

Politics and law
 Edgar Ord Laird – British High Commissioner to Brunei 1963–1965
 Edward Colborne Baber – colonial administrator (Rossall Junior School)
 Eric Alfred George Shackleton Bailey – Conservative MP for Manchester Gorton 1931–1935
 Robert Bernays – Liberal MP for Bristol North 1931–1945, Parliamentary Secretary to the Ministry of Health 1937–1939, Parliamentary Secretary to the Ministry of Transport 1939–1940
 Arthur John Bigge, 1st Baron Stamfordham Private Secretary to Queen Victoria (1895–1901) and to George V (1910–1931)
 Harry Brittain – Conservative MP for Acton 1918-1929 and founder of the Pilgrims Society
 Wilfred Banks Duncan Brown, Baron of Machrihanish – Minister of State at the Board of Trade 1970–1975 and member of the Privy Council
 Alfred Broughton – long-serving Labour MP, central to the Labour government downfall in 1979
 Milne Cheetham – diplomatic minister to Switzerland, Greece and Denmark
 Octavius Leigh Clare – Conservative MP for Eccles 1895–1906
 Sir Robert Francis Dunnell – solicitor, civil servant and railway executive
 Sir Hugh Forbes – British High Court Judge 1970–1985
 Sir Herbert Brent Grotrian, 1st Baronet – Unionist MP for South-West Hull 1924–1929
 Sir Henry Hoyle Howorth – barrister, author, Fellow of the Royal Society and Conservative MP for Salford South 1886–1900
 Pedro Pablo Kuczynski - 66th President of the Republic of Peru who had to leave due to corruption. 
 Neil Marten – Conservative MP for Banbury 1959–1983 and Minister for Overseas Development 1979–1983
 Charles Heron Mullan – Conservative MP for Down 1946–1950
 Oswald Partington, 2nd Baron Doverdale – Liberal MP 1900–1918
 Robert Frederick Ratcliff – MP for Burton 1900–1918
 William Rolleston – cabinet minister in New Zealand, and later Leader of the Opposition
 Walter Dorling Smiles – MP for Blackburn 1931–1945; later for Down 1945–1950 and for Down, North 1950–1953
 John Ellis Talbot – Conservative MP for Brierley Hill 1959–1967
 Walter Topping – Northern Irish Minister of Home Affairs
 George Frederic Verdon – Treasurer of Australia
 Derek Colclough Walker-Smith – Conservative MP for Hertford 1945–1955 and then for East Hertfordshire 1955–1983; Minister of Health
 Ralph Champneys Williams – Governor of Newfoundland
 Colonel Sir Charles Edward Yate – Conservative MP for Melton 1918–1924
 Robert Armstrong Yerburgh – Unionist MP for Chester 1886–1906 and 1910–1916

Religion
 Father Thomas R. D. Byles – Catholic priest who refused to leave the Titanic, in order to help fellow passengers. He perished as it sank.
 William Henry Temple Gairdner – missionary
 John Maurice Key – Bishop of Truro and Bishop of Sherborne
 Martin Patrick Grainge Leonard – Bishop of Thetford
 Mark Green – Bishop of Aston
 John Edward Mercer – Bishop of Tasmania
 William Moore Richardson – Bishop of Zanzibar
 Bryan Robin – Bishop of Adelaide
 George Sinker – Christian Missionary in India
 Wilfrid Lewis Mark Way – Bishop of Masasi
 Alwyn Williams – Bishop of Oxford, Durham and Winchester, chaplain to George V, prelate of the Order of the Garter, headmaster of Winchester College, and Dean of Christ Church

Science, medicine and engineering
 Sir William de Wiveleslie Abney – astronomer, chemist and photographer
 John Fleetwood Baker – civil engineer and designer of the Morrison indoor shelter
 William Blair-Bell – co-founder of the Royal College of Obstetricians and Gynaecologists
 David Brown – engineer, entrepreneur and one-time owner of Aston Martin; his initials are still given to the finest models of Aston Martin cars. He also owned Lagonda.
 Sir Frederick Brundrett – Chief Scientific adviser to the Ministry of Defence 1954–1960
 Professor Sir William Boyd Dawkins – geologist, archaeologist and fellow of The Royal Society
 George Garrett – clergyman and submarine designer
 Francis Graham-Smith – Astronomer Royal
 Dikran Tahta – maths teacher who inspired Stephen Hawking
 John Turtle Wood – architect, engineer and archaeologist

Sport
 Rex Crummack – 1920 Olympic gold medal winning hockey player
 Liam Botham – rugby union, rugby league and cricket player
 Walter Clopton Wingfield – the "inventor of lawn tennis"
 Paul Dalglish – football player (son of Kenny Dalglish)
 Michael Dickinson – world record holding National Hunt trainer
 Lewis Dingle – cricketer for Oxford University
 Harry Goodwin – cricketer for Gloucestershire
 Thomas Higson – cricketer for Derbyshire and Lancashire, and England test selector
 Nigel Howard – last amateur England cricket captain
 Francis Inge – cricketer
 John Inge – cricketer
 Arthur Irvin – cricketer
 Nick Köster – rugby player (attended Rossall as an exchange student for one year, 2005–2006)
 Ham Lambert – Irish international cricketer, rugby player and referee
 Chris Leck – rugby union player 
 Geoffrey Marsland – cricketer
 Philip Morton (1857–1925) – cricketer 
 Brian Redman – Formula 5000 champion
 Vernon Royle – England test cricketer
 Charles Eastlake Smith – footballer, played for England in 1876
 William Townshend – cricketer
 Benjamin Spilsbury – 19th-century England international footballer
 Geoffrey Plumpton Wilson (1878–1934), England international footballer
 Peter Winterbottom – England rugby union captain; also played for the Lions

Notable parents of Rossall students
 Jamil al-Assad – Syrian politician
 Ian Botham – cricketer
 Carl Brisson – silent film actor
 Kenny Dalglish – football manager
 Syd Little – comedian
 Sir Frank Whittle – inventor of the jet engine
 Bruno Labaddia - football manager

Notable masters
 John Ambrose Fleming – inventor
 Walter Besant – novelist and historian
 Warin Foster Bushell – President of the Mathematical Association
 Robert Clayton – 19th-century England and Yorkshire cricketer
 Harry Dean – cricketer (coach at Rossall)
 Jack Ellis – rugby player
 Paul Grice – philosopher
 John Eldon Gorst – politician
 S. P. B. Mais – author and journalist
 Rupert Morris – clergyman, antiquarian and chaplain to the Duke of Westminster
 John Rees – Welsh rugby international
 Owen Seaman – poet, journalist and editor of Punch
 Thomas Llewellyn Thomas – scholar of the Welsh language
 George Utley – England international and twice FA Cup winner, assistant cricket coach from 1911 to 1931

Notable Council Members
 Spencer Cavendish, 8th Duke of Devonshire – Leader of the Liberal Party; later Leader of the Conservative Party in the House of Lords
 Walter Clegg – Conservative MP
 Wilbraham Egerton, 1st Earl Egerton – landowner and MP
 Robert Ladds – Bishop of Whitby
 William Temple – Archbishop of Canterbury
 Edward Henry Stanley – 15th Earl of Derby and Foreign Secretary (son of Edward Smith-Stanley, 14th Earl of Derby and Prime Minister)
 Frederick Arthur Stanley – 16th Earl of Derby, notable for donating the Stanley Cup
 John Woolley – first Principal of the University of Sydney
 Every Earl of Derby since the 15th Earl of Derby has been President of the Corporation of Rossall School

Fictional
 Dan Dare

References

 
Rossalians
Rossall School
Old Rossallians